Gelignite, also known as blasting gelatin or simply "jelly", is an explosive material consisting of collodion-cotton (a type of nitrocellulose or guncotton) dissolved in either nitroglycerine or nitroglycol and mixed with wood pulp and saltpetre (sodium nitrate or potassium nitrate).

It was invented in 1875, by Swedish chemist Alfred Nobel, who also invented dynamite. It is more stable than dynamite, but can still suffer from "sweating" or leaching out nitroglycerine. Its composition makes it easily moldable and safe to handle without protection, as long as it is not near anything capable of detonating it. 

One of the cheapest explosives, it burns slowly and cannot explode without a detonator, so it can be stored safely.

In the United Kingdom, an explosives certificate, issued by the local Chief Officer of Police, is required for possession of gelignite. Due to its widespread civilian use in quarries and mining, it has historically been used by terrorist groups such as the Provisional Irish Republican Army and the Ulster Volunteer Force who often used gelignite as a booster.

Frangex
The 1970s saw Irish Industrial Explosives Limited producing annually 6,000 tonnes of Frangex, a commercial gelignite intended for use in mines and quarries. It was produced at Ireland's largest explosives factory in Enfield, County Meath. The Gardaí and the Irish Army patrolled the area, preventing the IRA from gaining direct access. 

However, the Provisional Irish Republican Army (PIRA) indirectly acquired amounts of the material. At the time of Patrick Magee's arrest,  was found in his possession.  was discovered in a hijacked road tanker in January 1976.

PIRA volunteer, later informer, Sean O'Callaghan estimated that planting  of Frangex would kill everyone within an  radius. The Real IRA (RIRA) also acquired Frangex, and, in December 2000, eighty sticks were discovered on a farm in Kilmacow, County Kilkenny, near Waterford.

In early 1982 the Irish National Liberation Army stole  of Frangex commercial explosives from the Tara mines in County Tipperary, enabling the organisation to intensify its bombing campaign. The INLA carried out its deadliest attack in December 1982 with the bombing of the Droppin' Well disco in Ballykelly, County Londonderry, which catered to British military personnel, in which 11 soldiers on leave and 6 civilians were killed. A bomb, estimated to be  of Frangex explosive, small enough to fit into a handbag, was left beside a support pillar and brought down the roof when it exploded .

References

Alfred Nobel
Explosives
Swedish inventions